Crown Prince Abdullah may refer to
Abdullah, King of Saudi Arabia
'Abd al-Ilah, Crown Prince of Iraq